The Harnsberger Octagonal Barn, also known the Mt. Meridian Octagonal Barn, is located near Grottoes, Virginia. Built about 1867, the barn is possibly the only example of such a barn in  Virginia, as the building style was more popular in the expanding midwestern United States in the immediate post-American Civil War era than in economically depressed Virginia. The octagonal style was popularized in 1853 by A Home For All, or the Gravel Wall and Octagon Mode of Building by Orson Squire Fowler.

The barn was built for Robert Samuel Harnsberger in 1867, following the example of his brother Stephen, who had  built an octagonal house nearby in 1856.  The barn represents an adaptation of the octagonal concept to the site, incorporating elements of traditional bank barns. The barn's builders encountered difficulty in assembling and fitting the barn, requiring the assistance of other carpenters.

The wood frame barn retains the traditional bank barn functions of a central wagon floor with hay lofts to either side, rather than a functional distinction between each of the sides as suggested by Fowler.  As with a bank barn, accommodations for cattle are on the lower level, with the stalls arranged in a line rather than radially.

The barn was placed on the National Register of Historic Places on July 8, 1982.

References

External links

 Harnsberger Octagonal Barn, Virginia Route 256, West of Intersection with Virginia Route 865, Grottoes vicinity, Augusta, VA at the Historic American Buildings Survey (HABS)

Barns on the National Register of Historic Places in Virginia
National Register of Historic Places in Augusta County, Virginia
Infrastructure completed in 1867
Buildings and structures in Augusta County, Virginia
Octagon barns in the United States
Historic American Buildings Survey in Virginia
1867 establishments in Virginia
Barns in Virginia